CRON Systems is a defence technology start up which builds Multi-sensor enabled intrusion detection systems. Founded by Tushar Chhabra and co-founders Saurav Agarwala, Tomer Katzenellenbogen it creates end-to-end encrypted solutions which are capable of distinguishing between intrusion by a human and an animal. Besides ground intrusion, CRON systems also builds solutions to detect drones, and is working on automated patrol vehicles .

In September 2016, Indian Border Security Force (BSF) installed several CRON laser walls at hostile areas along the border, to keep a vigil on intrusion attempts from across India's western border.

References

Further reading

Internet of things companies
Defence companies of India